Wolfram Wagner (born 24 June 1972) is a German retired footballer who played as a midfielder.

References

External links
 
 
 
 
 Wolfram Wagner at RSSSF

1972 births
Living people
German footballers
Association football midfielders
Dynamo Dresden players
Dresdner SC players
Bundesliga players